The year 1958 was the 177th year of the Rattanakosin Kingdom of Thailand. It was the 13th year in the reign of King Bhumibol Adulyadej (Rama IX), and is reckoned as year 2501 in the Buddhist Era.

Incumbents
King: Bhumibol Adulyadej
Crown Prince: (vacant)
Prime Minister:
1 January - 20 October: Thanom Kittikachorn
starting 20 October: National Revolutionize Council (junta)
Supreme Patriarch:
until 11 November: Vajirananavongs

Events

January

February

March

April

May

June

July

August

September

October

November

December

Births
 Vichai Srivaddhanaprabha, Thai billionaire businessman (d. 2018)

Deaths

See also
 List of Thai films of 1958
 1958 in Thai television

References

External links

 
Thailand
Years of the 20th century in Thailand
Thailand
1950s in Thailand